Marshall William Davies (born 17 August 1930) was a first-class cricketer who played for Rhodesia in the Currie Cup.

After appearing for Rhodesia sporadically from his debut in 1951, Davies cemented a spot in the middle order in the 1954-55 Currie Cup season by making 353 runs at 58.83. This tally included his highest first-class score of 133 which he made against Griqualand West at De Beers Stadium in Kimberley.

Davies did even better the following season and from his six matches made 432 runs 61.71, with another century against Griqualand West and one against Orange Free State.

References

External links

1930 births
Living people
Cricketers from Bulawayo
Zimbabwean cricketers
Rhodesia cricketers